Shunduk is a rural locality (a khutor) in Ponezhukayskoye Rural Settlement of Teuchezhsky District, the Republic of Adygea, Russia. The population was 17 as of 2018. There is 1 street.

Geography 
The khutor is located on the right bank of the Shunduk river, 8 km northwest of Ponezhukay (the district's administrative centre) by road. Pshikuykhabl is the nearest rural locality.

References 

Rural localities in Teuchezhsky District